Heroku is a cloud platform as a service (PaaS) supporting several programming languages. One of the first cloud platforms, Heroku has been in development since June 2007, when it supported only the Ruby programming language, but now supports Java, Node.js, Scala, Clojure, Python, PHP, and Go. For this reason, Heroku is said to be a polyglot platform as it has features for a developer to build, run and scale applications in a similar manner across most languages.  Heroku was acquired by Salesforce in 2010 for $212 million.

History 
Heroku was initially developed by James Lindenbaum, Adam Wiggins, and Orion Henry for supporting projects that were compatible with the Ruby programming platform known as Rack. The prototype development took around six months. Later on, Heroku faced setbacks because of lack of proper market customers as many app developers used their own tools and environment. In January 2009, a new platform was launched which was built almost from scratch after a three-month effort. In October 2009, Byron Sebastian joined Heroku as CEO. On December 8, 2010, Salesforce.com acquired Heroku as a wholly owned subsidiary of Salesforce.com. On July 12, 2011, Yukihiro "Matz" Matsumoto, the chief designer of the Ruby programming language, joined the company as Chief Architect, Ruby. That same month, Heroku added support for Node.js and Clojure. On September 15, 2011, Heroku and Facebook introduced Heroku for Facebook. At present Heroku supports Redis databases in addition to its standard PostgreSQL.

In August 2022, Heroku announced that its free plans would be discontinued, citing fraud and abuse as reasons for the change, leaving many customers upset.

Etymology 
The name "Heroku" is a portmanteau of "heroic" and "haiku". The Japanese theme is a nod to Matz for creating Ruby.  The name itself is pronounced similarly to the Japanese word meaning “widely” (hiroku), though the creators of Heroku did not want the name of their project to have a particular meaning, in Japanese or any other language, and so chose to invent a name.

Architecture 

Applications that are run on Heroku typically have a unique domain used to route HTTP requests to the correct application container or dyno. Each of the dynos  are spread across a "dyno grid" which consists of several servers. Heroku's Git server handles application repository pushes from permitted users.

All Heroku services are hosted on Amazon's EC2 cloud-computing platform.

Products 

 The Heroku Platform
 The Heroku network runs the customer's apps in virtual containers which execute on a reliable runtime environment. Heroku calls these containers "Dynos". These Dynos can run code written in Node, Ruby, PHP, Go, Scala, Python, Java, or Clojure. Heroku also provides custom buildpacks with which the developer can deploy apps in any other language. Heroku lets the developer scale the app instantly just by either increasing the number of dynos or by changing the type of dyno the app runs in.
 Heroku Postgres
 Heroku Postgres is the Cloud database (DBaaS) service for Heroku based on PostgreSQL. Heroku Postgres provides features like continuous protection, rollback, and high availability; also forks, followers, and dataclips.
 Heroku Redis
 Heroku Redis is the customized Redis from Heroku to provide a better developer experience. It is fully managed and is provided as a service by Heroku. It helps in managing instances with a CLI, associate data with Postgres to gain business insights using SQL tools, and lets customer gain performance visibility.
 Heroku Teams
 Heroku Teams is a team management tool which provides collaboration and controls to bring a customer's developers, processes, and tools together in order to build better software. With Heroku Teams, teams can self-organize, add, and manage members, get fine-grained control with app-level permissions and also use collaboration tools like Heroku Pipelines. It also provides delegated administration and centralized billing.
 Heroku Enterprise
 Heroku Enterprise provides services to large companies which help them to improve collaboration among different teams. It provides a set of features like fine-grained access controls, identity federation, and private spaces to manage their enterprise application development process, resources, and users.
 Heroku Connect
 Heroku Connect lets users create Heroku apps that can easily integrate with Salesforce deployments at scale. This is done by having a seamless data synchronization between Heroku Postgres databases and Salesforce organizations.
 Heroku Elements
 Heroku Elements provides users with Add-ons (tools and services for developing, extending, and operating the app), Buildpacks (which automate the build processes for the preferred languages and frameworks) and Buttons (a tool for the one-click provisioning, configuring, and deployment of third party components, libraries and patterns).

References

External links 
 

Salesforce
2010 mergers and acquisitions
Software companies established in 2007
American companies established in 2007
Cloud computing providers
Cloud infrastructure
Cloud platforms
Cloud storage
Companies based in San Francisco
Serverless computing
Y Combinator companies